Tân Lạc is a township and capital of Quỳ Châu District, Nghệ An Province, Vietnam.

The township was formed in 1990 from a portion of Châu Hạnh commune and was originally named Quỳ Châu, after the district. In 2010, the township annexed some adjacent neighborhood of Châu Hạnh commune and was renamed Tân Lạc.

Tân Lạc covers an area of 5.48 km2. Its population as of May 2010 was 4,040.

References
  

Populated places in Nghệ An province
District capitals in Vietnam
Townships in Vietnam